Go – The Very Best of Moby is a compilation album by American electronic musician Moby, released in 2006. Various versions of the album were released around the world with different track listings, including single-disc versions containing hit singles, and two-disc versions which include singles plus a second disc of (mainly) remixes. The previously unreleased "New York, New York" featuring vocals by Debbie Harry, is also included in the release.

Remixed 

A remix album, Go – The Very Best of Moby: Remixed was released in March 2007. All of the tracks are remixes of Moby's work by other producers and remixers, apart from track 17, which is a remix Moby himself produced.

The tracks are not mixed into each other, but most of them are edits of the original remixes. Editing is credited to RJ, James Aparicio, David Loudoun, and Saxo. The digital download version omits tracks 16 and 17.

Track listing

Five different versions of Go – The Very Best of Moby were released in different regions of the world.  Each version contains different songs, based on the singles and their popularity in that region.  All songs are edited versions of the album mixes, unless noted.

 Single-disc editions
A single-disc version of the album was released in the United Kingdom, France, and South America. The Danish single-disc version is similar to the South American one except it does not include "Bodyrock" and "Beautiful". The two-disc international deluxe edition was also available for sale in these regions for an additional price.

 Two-disc deluxe editions
Two different versions of two-disc deluxe editions were made — one for the United States, and also an international version to be sold in all other countries.  In the United Kingdom, France, and South America, the deluxe international version was sold in addition to the single-disc versions listed above.

 DVD
The DVD features 27 music titles by Moby, chronologically ordered. One of the notable omissions was the music video for "South Side", featuring Gwen Stefani.

 "Go" – 3:38
 "Hymn" – 3:44
 "Feeling So Real" – 3:13
 "Everytime You Touch Me" — 3:52
 "Into The Blue" – 4:06
 "That's When I Reach For My Revolver" – 3:57
 "Come On Baby" – 3:51
 "James Bond Theme (Moby's re-version)" – 3:28
 "Honey" – 3:24
 "Run On" – 3:11
 "Bodyrock" – 3:37
 "Why Does My Heart Feel So Bad?" – 3:44
 "Natural Blues" – 4:15
 "Find My Baby" – 3:07
 "Porcelain" – 3:11
 "We Are All Made Of Stars" – 3:35
 "Extreme Ways" – 3:33
 "In This World" – 3:29
 "Sunday (The Day Before My Birthday)" —3:25
 "Jam For The Ladies" – 3:23
 "Make Love F*** War" – 3:23
 "Lift Me Up" – 3:08
 "Spiders" – 3:45
 "Beautiful" – 3:19
 "Raining Again" – 3:49
 "Dream About Me" —3:25
 "Slipping Away" – 3:42

Extra Tracks: 
 "Bodyrock" (audition version) – 3:28
 "Natural Blues" (German animated version) – 3:03
 "Porcelain" (US version) – 3:12
 "Extreme Ways" (bourne identity cut) – 3:31

 Go – The Very Best of Moby: Remixed

Charts

Weekly charts

Year-end charts

Certifications

External links
 Billboard press release
 Official Site

References

2006 greatest hits albums
Moby compilation albums
Moby video albums
2006 video albums
Music video compilation albums
Mute Records compilation albums
Mute Records video albums
Albums produced by Moby